Sand Point Lake is a lake on the border of Minnesota and Ontario.  Approximately half of the lake is in Minnesota, USA and the other half is in Ontario, Canada. The Minnesota portion is within Voyageurs National Park. The Sand Point Lake Water Aerodrome is located on the Ontario side.

See also
Clearwater Bay, Ontario

Lakes of Rainy River District
Lakes of Minnesota